Ennis is an unincorporated community in McDowell County, West Virginia, United States. Ennis lies on U.S. Route 52, west of Switchback.

The community most likely was named after a local family. The town of Ennis was named after Joanna Ennis McQuail, wife of coal operator William Mcquail.  The McQuail family owned Ennis Coal Company as well as Turkey Gap Coal Company (source, Helen McQuail, great grand daughter of William and Joanna McQuail)

Unincorporated communities in McDowell County, West Virginia
Coal towns in West Virginia
Unincorporated communities in West Virginia